Jordanita fazekasi is a moth of the family Zygaenidae. It is found in southern Hungary.

The length of the forewings is 12.1–13.1 mm for males.

References

C. M. Naumann, W. G. Tremewan: The Western Palaearctic Zygaenidae. Apollo Books, Stenstrup 1999, 

Procridinae
Moths described in 1998
Endemic fauna of Hungary
Moths of Europe